Erode Clock Tower is a clock tower located in Erode, Tamil Nadu, India also known as Manikkoondu.

History

The original Clock Tower was built by English for the benefit of this busy market traders. It is located in the center of old town near Panneerselvam Park, which is now the Bazaar area of Erode. It is built at a busy junction where five roads emerges out, named Netaji Road, RKV Road, Brough Road and Easwaran Kovil Road or Fort Road. Logically, it is the zero point of Erode town. South of this clock tower houses Textile Market and North of this clock tower houses Vegetable Market. This clock tower is exactly located at the eastern entrance of Erode Fort. The actual Fort has been demolished and the name alone is retained for this area. In olden days, the eastern areas from this clock tower were called as Pettai.

Though the original structure has been demolished with road developments, alternative structures has been constructed in the place by Erode City Municipal Corporation. However there was no clock tower structure present in this place for some period of time, the location managed to retain its name and still called by local people as Clock Tower or Manikkoondu in Tamil.

To retain the glory of past, in February 2006, Erode City Municipal Corporation has planned to construct a modern clock tower in the same place. A 50-feet tall tower structure has been designed and constructed in 2009, along with a Police Watch Tower in the middle. 

Later in 2015, this tower has been removed and a new structure has been built with public-private contribution. And it is the third structure in the same place which is still serving for the public and retaining the glory.

References

Erode
Clock towers in India
Buildings and structures in Tamil Nadu